Yehor Anatoliyovych Nazaryna (born 10 July 1997) is a Ukrainian professional footballer who plays as a central midfielder for Shakhtar Donetsk.

Career
Nazaryna is a product of Yevropa Pryluky (first coach was Andriy Shmatko) and Dynamo Kyiv academies.

He made his debut as a substituted player in the second half-time for Dnipro in the match against Stal Kamianske on 20 May 2017 in the Ukrainian Premier League.

Career statistics

References

External links
 
 

1997 births
Living people
People from Pryluky
Ukrainian footballers
Ukraine youth international footballers
Ukraine under-21 international footballers
Association football midfielders
FC Dnipro players
Royal Antwerp F.C. players
FC Karpaty Lviv players
FC Zorya Luhansk players
Ukrainian Premier League players
Ukrainian Second League players
Belgian Pro League players
Ukrainian expatriate footballers
Expatriate footballers in Belgium
Ukrainian expatriate sportspeople in Belgium
Sportspeople from Chernihiv Oblast
FC Shakhtar Donetsk players
21st-century Ukrainian people